Michael "Mick" McLoughlin is an Irish Gaelic footballer for Wicklow. McLoughlin plays for the GAA club Blessington of West County Wicklow and is also a member of the Wicklow senior football team.

References

Year of birth missing (living people)
Living people
Blessington Gaelic footballers
Dublin Gaelic footballers
Wicklow inter-county Gaelic footballers